Jomang (Ajomang, Gajomang), or Talodi, is a Niger–Congo language in the Talodi family of Kordofan, Sudan. Talodi is spoken in Tasomi and Tata villages (Ethnologue, 22nd edition).

Grammar

Noun Classes 
As most languages of the Talodi Family, it uses noun classes to indicate if the word is in the singular or a plural form. There exist both two-class and one-class gender groups, and in all of them mostly consonant prefixes are used as an indicator. Follwing is presented the noun class chart of Talodi after Schadeberg (1981: 50-51):

References

Critically endangered languages
Talodi languages